Ažuožeriai (or Užuožeriai) is a village in Anykščiai district municipality, in Utena County, in northeast Lithuania. According to the 2011 census, the village has a population of 383 people.

Prevailing agricultural branch of local farming is gardening. Surroundings feature wood carvings commemorating spot of writer A. Vienuolis' native homestead and his creative folk heroes of stargazer Šmukštaras, drowned myrmidon Veronika.

Nearby- Ilgis Lake, Šventoji River, Queen's Quagmire, Brother of Puntukas Stone.

Famous villagers
Antanas Vienuolis (1882–1957), writer
Janina Cibienė (1932–2003), writer

References

Anykščiai District Municipality
Villages in Utena County